Oleg Nikolayevich Chukhleba (born 5 November 1967) is a former Kazakhstani football player.

External links
 

1967 births
Living people
People from Petropavl
Soviet footballers
FC Kyzylzhar players
FC Kairat players
FC Zorya Luhansk players
Kazakhstani footballers
Kazakhstani expatriate footballers
Expatriate footballers in Ukraine
Kazakhstani expatriate sportspeople in Ukraine
Ukrainian Premier League players
FC Dnipro players
FC Lada-Tolyatti players
Expatriate footballers in Russia
Russian Premier League players
FC Lokomotiv Nizhny Novgorod players
FC Spartak Semey players
Association football midfielders
Association football defenders